Robin Bist (born 2 November 1987) is an Indian cricketer who plays for Uttarakhand in domestic cricket. He is a right-hand batsman and an off-break bowler. He was part of Delhi Daredevils squad in the Indian Premier League.

Bist was the leading run-scorer of Ranji Trophy 2011–12, where he scored 1034 runs from 16 innings at a whopping average of 86.16 including four centuries. His performances helped him get an IPL contract with the Delhi Daredevils. In November 2012 Robin Bist was released by Delhi Daredevils.

In August 2015, he moved to Himachal Pradesh for 2015–16 Ranji Trophy for two year following Rajasthan Cricket Association had been suspended by the BCCI in May 2015. For the Ranji trophy 2017-18 he returned to Rajasthan.

In November 2018, he scored his 6,000th run in first-class cricket, batting for Rajasthan against Jammu & Kashmir in the 2018–19 Ranji Trophy. He was the leading run-scorer for Rajasthan in the group-stage of the 2018–19 Ranji Trophy, with 684 runs in nine matches. He finished the tournament with 741 runs in ten matches.

References

External links 

1987 births
Living people
Indian cricketers
Rajasthan cricketers
Uttarakhand cricketers
Delhi Capitals cricketers
Central Zone cricketers
Himachal Pradesh cricketers